Barangay San José or most commonly known as Barangay Oco (PSGC: 052010023) is one of the thirty-one (31) barangays of Viga in the province of Catanduanes, Philippines. According to the latest census, it has a population of 1,163 inhabitants (grew from 1,040 in Census 2007). In August 2015 census, the population grew +0.33% from 1,163 to 1,183 inhabitants.

The Barrio Oco was changed to Barangay San Jose with the passage of R.A. No. 5561 on June 21 of 1969.

Geography

San Jose Oco is mostly rugged and mountainous terrain. The nearest prominent mountain forms with important significance include the ranges are Magkanumpor and Magsumoso. It has a vast area of rice paddies. It is among the agricultural barangay of the municipality of Viga, considered as the rice granary of the province. The two types of agricultural products raised are the food and crops. The food crops being raised are palay, corn, banana, camote and other root crops. The export crops are mainly Abacá. It is the principal source of livelihood by the Oconons.

Demography

According to 2010 Census, it has a population of 1,163 inhabitants, grew from 1,040 in Census 2007. August 2015 census the population grew for at least +0.33% making 1,183 total inhabitants.

Viga Interior Barangays
Composed of 10 Barangays and has a total population of 8,425.

 Almojuela
 Burgos
 Del Pilar
 Osmeña
 Pedro Vera (Summit)
 Quezon
 Rizal
 Roxas
 Sagrada
 San Jose Oco †

Barangay Officials

Former Elected Barangay Officials

Teniente Del Barrio/Cabesa de Barangay
Elected Officials 1945 - 1969

Hon. Ambrosio Tuquero
Hon. Segundo Fernandez
Hon. Julian Tusi
Hon. Francisco Taule

Former Barangay Captains (1970-2013)

Hon. Nicanor Tuplano
Hon. Mario Ramos
Hon. Jose Tubeo
Hon. Jesus Tuno
Hon. Honesto Aquino
Hon. Celso Tuquero
Hon. Yolando V. Tuquero
Hon. Willie D. Tapel
Hon. Rizalino O. Tuplano

Current Elected Barangay Officials
Barangay Captain
 Hon. Alex L. Alcantara

Sangguniang Barangay Members

 Hon. Emmanuel T. Barcel
 Hon. Benigno Olesco Jr.
 Hon. Decery Aquino
 Hon. Ireneo Tusi Jr.
 Hon. John U. Tuplano
 Hon. Joselito F. Tubeo
 Hon. Jovert T. Tuquero
 Hon. Charlyn V. Tolod (SK)

Barangay Secretary
 Mrs. Rosalie O. Tumaque (Appointed)

Barangay Treasurer
 Mrs. Emily P. Tumaque(Appointed)

Education

Elementary school
List of public elementary schools in Viga Interior

National High School
The table below contains the list of all the public senior high schools found in Catanduanes published by the Department of Education or DepEd. Included on the list are the municipalities, school ID, school names, and program offerings.

San Jose Oco National High School is the only public school offering Senior High School curriculum in Viga Interior.

See also 
 Viga, Catanduanes
 Catanduanes, Philippines
 Catanduanes State University

References

Barangays of the Philippines
Populated places in Catanduanes